Andrei Sobennicov (born 1 April 1988) is a Moldovan cyclist, who currently rides for UCI Continental team UVT-Devron West Cycling Team .

Major results
2021
 National Road Championships
1st  Road race
2nd Time trial

References

1988 births
Living people
Moldovan male cyclists
Sportspeople from Chișinău